Songs That Made America Famous is the fifth album by Patrick Sky, released on Adelphi Records in 1973.  Sky recorded the album in 1971 but had difficulty finding a label to release it, as the satirical lyrics are explicit.

Track listing
All songs by Patrick Sky unless otherwise noted.

Side One
"Fight for Liberation"
"Radcliffe Highway"
"Vatican Caskets"
"Child Molesting Blues"
"Okie"
"Under All Flag"
"Luang Prabang" (Dave Van Ronk)

Side two
"Our Baby Die"
"Ramblin' Hunchback"
"Bake Dat Chicken Pie" (Dumont)
"Rock Star"
"The Pope" (Mike Hunt)
"Yonkers Girl "
"H. Bromovitz"

1973 albums
Patrick Sky albums
Adelphi Records albums
Satirical works